Kidurong was a state constituency in Sarawak, Malaysia, that was represented in the Sarawak State Legislative Assembly from 1991 to 2016.

The state constituency was created in the 1987 redistribution and was mandated to return a single member to the Sarawak State Legislative Assembly under the first past the post voting system.

History
It was abolished in 2016 after it was redistributed.

2006–2016: The constituency contains the polling districts of Bintulu Town, Sibiew Similajau, Bukit Orang, Tanjung Batu, Tanjung Kidurong, Suai, Li Hua, Melor, Mawar, RPR Kidurong.

Representation history

Election results

References

Defunct Sarawak state constituencies